Kerepehi is a rural community in the Hauraki District and Waikato region of New Zealand's North Island. The alternative spelling Kerepeehi was in use until 1933.

Demographics
It is part of the wider Hauraki Plains South statistical area.

Kerepehi had a population of 507 at the 2018 New Zealand census, an increase of 102 people (25.2%) since the 2013 census, and an increase of 21 people (4.3%) since the 2006 census. There were 186 households, comprising 267 males and 246 females, giving a sex ratio of 1.09 males per female, with 126 people (24.9%) aged under 15 years, 99 (19.5%) aged 15 to 29, 213 (42.0%) aged 30 to 64, and 69 (13.6%) aged 65 or older.

Ethnicities were 72.2% European/Pākehā, 45.6% Māori, 5.3% Pacific peoples, 1.2% Asian, and 1.8% other ethnicities. People may identify with more than one ethnicity.

Although some people chose not to answer the census's question about religious affiliation, 59.2% had no religion, 18.3% were Christian, 8.9% had Māori religious beliefs and 3.0% had other religions.

Of those at least 15 years old, 18 (4.7%) people had a bachelor's or higher degree, and 123 (32.3%) people had no formal qualifications. 21 people (5.5%) earned over $70,000 compared to 17.2% nationally. The employment status of those at least 15 was that 174 (45.7%) people were employed full-time, 54 (14.2%) were part-time, and 21 (5.5%) were unemployed.

Hauraki Plains South

Hauraki Plains South had a population of 1,533 at the 2018 New Zealand census, an increase of 138 people (9.9%) since the 2013 census, and a decrease of 3 people (−0.2%) since the 2006 census. There were 537 households, comprising 783 males and 750 females, giving a sex ratio of 1.04 males per female. The median age was 33.6 years (compared with 37.4 years nationally), with 396 people (25.8%) aged under 15 years, 282 (18.4%) aged 15 to 29, 681 (44.4%) aged 30 to 64, and 174 (11.4%) aged 65 or older.

Ethnicities were 81.2% European/Pākehā, 25.8% Māori, 3.1% Pacific peoples, 4.5% Asian, and 2.0% other ethnicities. People may identify with more than one ethnicity.

The percentage of people born overseas was 11.7, compared with 27.1% nationally.

Although some people chose not to answer the census's question about religious affiliation, 60.1% had no religion, 24.5% were Christian, 3.5% had Māori religious beliefs and 2.5% had other religions.

Of those at least 15 years old, 108 (9.5%) people had a bachelor's or higher degree, and 294 (25.9%) people had no formal qualifications. The median income was $33,000, compared with $31,800 nationally. 132 people (11.6%) earned over $70,000 compared to 17.2% nationally. The employment status of those at least 15 was that 606 (53.3%) people were employed full-time, 180 (15.8%) were part-time, and 33 (2.9%) were unemployed.

Education

References

Hauraki District
Populated places in Waikato